David Trumfio (born August 16, 1968) is an American record producer, mixer, engineer and musician, best known for his production work with artists such as Wilco and his recordings with his own band The Pulsars.

Production work 
Trumfio grew up in Mt. Prospect, Illinois, and was a staff engineer after apprenticing at Seagrape Recording Studios. He started his home studio, Kingsize Recording Den, and officially opened Kingsize Soundlabs in Chicago's Wicker Park district in 1991 with partner Mike Hagler. He currently resides in Los Angeles and runs Kingsize SoundLabs, a recording studio in Glassell Park, California.

His early work included recordings by Evil Beaver, The Mekons, Wilco, Alternative TV, Young Marble Giants guitarist Stewart Moxham and British rock band The Pretty Things.

He has since worked with acts such as Wilco, OK Go, and Patrick Park.

Trumfio has worked for independent record labels such as Merge, TeenBeat Records, Touch and Go Records/Quarterstick Records, Minty Fresh, Simple Machines, Darla Records and Vagrant. He has also produced recordings by  singer songwriter Patrick Park, chamber pop band The Aluminum Group, funk musicians The Baldwin Brothers, Number One Cup, and Franklin Bruno.

Trumfio has more recently worked with Built To Spill, American Music Club, Booker T, new wave revivalists The Rentals, and Australian band Papa vs Pretty.

Musician 
Trumfio was the frontman in the 90's new-wave band The Pulsars, in which he did "everything but play the drums", his brother Harry acting as the band's drummer.
After releasing their debut single, the band signed to Herb Alpert and Jerry Moss's post A&M venture Almo Sounds in 1995, and released an album and two EPs.

He also played in Ashtray Boy, The Mekons (intermittently), in Sally Timms' band, and on The Aluminum Group's Plano album. After bassist Sarah Corina left the Mekons in 2015, Trumfio replaced her, at least through 2019.

Production discography

1991–1999 

 Big Jack Johnson — Daddy, When Is Mama Comin' Home (1991)
 Mr. Fingers — Introduction (1992)
 Certain Distant Suns — Huge E.P. (1992)
 Ashtray Boy — Honeymoon Suite (1993)
 Certain Distant Suns — Happy on the Inside (1994)
 Various Artists — Insurgent Country, Vol.1: For a Life of Sin (Bloodshot Records, 1994)
 DQE — But Me, I Fell Down (1994)
 Pigface — Notes from Thee Underground (1994)
 The Mekons — Retreat from Memphis (1994)
 The Pretty Things — Wine, Women & Whiskey: More Chicago Blues & Rock Sess (1994)
 Jonboy Langford & The Pine Valley Cosmonauts — Misery Loves Company: Songs of Johnny Cash (1995)
 The Handsome Family — Odessa (1995)
 Number One Cup — Possum Trot Plan (1995)
 Holiday — Holiday (1995)
 Number One Cup — Divebomb (1996)
 The Handsome Family — Milk and Scissors (1996)
 Yum-Yum — Dan Loves Patti (1996)
 The Coctails — Live at Lounge Ax (1996)
 Holiday — Ready, Steady, Go (1996)
 Butterglory — Are You Building a Temple in Heaven (1996)
 Rico Bell — Return of Rico Bell (1996)
 Motorhome — Sex Vehicle (1996)
 The Pulsars — Submission to the Masters (1996)
 Godzuki — Trail of the Lonesome Pine (1996)
 The Pulsars — Pulsars (1997)
 Palace Music — Lost Blues & Other Songs (1997)
 Tsunami — Brilliant Mistake (1997)
 hollAnd — Your Orgasm (1997)
 Billy Bragg & Wilco — Mermaid Avenue (1998)
 Aluminum Group — Plano (1998)
 The Legendary Jim Ruiz Group — Sniff (1998)
 Sally Timms — Cowboy Sally's Twilight Laments for Lost Buckaroos (1999)
 Wilco — Summerteeth (1999)
 Floraline — Floraline (1999)

2000–2009 

 Tristeza — Dream Signals In Full Circles (2000)
 Aden — Hey 19 (2000)
 Koufax — It Had to Do With Love (2000)
 Billy Bragg & Wilco — Mermaid Avenue, Vol. 2 (2000)
 The Prescriptions — Why We Don't Rent to Women (2000)
 My Morning Jacket — At Dawn (2001)
 Jenny Toomey — Antidote (2001)
 Justin Planasch — Roam (2001)
 Gift Original Soundtrack — Original Soundtrack (2001)
 Wayne Kramer — Adult World (2002)
 Franklin Bruno — Cat May Look at a Queen (2002)
 The Baldwin Brothers — Cooking with Lasers (2002)
 Irving — Good Morning Beautiful (2002)
 Various Artists — MTV2 Handpicked, Vol. 2 (2002)
 Mates of State — Our Constant Concern (2002)
 Koufax — Social Life (2002)
 Ok Go — Get Over It (2002)
 Slowrider — Nacimiento (2002)
 Ok Go — Ok Go (2002)
 Earlimart — Avenues (2003)
 Patrick Park — Loneliness Knows My Name (2003)
 The Sun — Love & Death (2003)
 Jamison Parker — Notes & Photographs EP (2003)
 Underworld Original Soundtrack — Original Soundtrack (2003)
 The Velvet Teen — Elysium (2004)
 Chuck Prophet — Age Of Miracles (2004)
 Kool Keith/Kutmasta Kurt — Break U Off/Takin' It Back (2004)
 Thelonious Monster — California Clam Chowder (2004)
 Simon Joyner — Lost with the Lights On (2004)
 Elkland — Apart (2005)
 Elkland — Apart (The Remixes) (2005)
 Elkland — Golden (2005)
 Nothing Painted Blue — Taste the Flavor (2005)
 Koufax – Hard Times Are in Fashion (2005)
 Grandaddy — Excerpts From The Diary of Todd Zilla (2005)
 Grandaddy — Just Like the Fambly Cat (2006)
 Future Pigeon — Echodelic Sounds of Future Pigeon (2006)
 The Baldwin Brothers — The Return of the Golden Rhodes (2006)
 The Adored — New Language (2006)
 Devics — Push the Heart (2006)
 Nadine Zahr — Underneath the Everyday (2006)
 Earlimart — Mentor Tormentor (2007)
 Acute — Arms Around a Stranger (2007)
 Let's Go Sailing — Chaos in Order (2007)
 Patrick Park — Everyone's in Everyone (2007)
 Kristin Mooney — Hydroplane (2007)
 American Music Club — Golden Age (2008)
 E for Explosion — Reinventing the Heartbeat (2008)
 Great Northern — Sleepy Eepee (2008)
 Devics — Distant Radio (2008)
 The Rentals — Songs About Time (2009)
 Built to Spill — There Is No Enemy (2009)
 MC Lars — This Gigantic Robot Kills (2009)

2010–present 
(incomplete)
 Papa vs Pretty — White Deer Park (2014)
 Mekons — Deserted (2019)

References

External links 
The Pulsars official website
Dave Trumfio: Monthly Special at vintageking.com
Interview with Dave Trumfio (Wilco, OK Go, Patrick Park) at vintagemicrophone.com

Record producers from Illinois
American rock songwriters
Living people
1968 births
Songwriters from Illinois
Guitarists from Chicago
American male bass guitarists
The Mekons members
20th-century American bass guitarists
20th-century American male musicians
American male songwriters